Angelo Baretta (died 1539) was a Roman Catholic prelate who served as Bishop of Capri (1534–1539).

Biography
On 24 April 1534, Eusebio de Granito was appointed during the papacy of Pope Clement VII as Bishop of Capri. He served as Bishop of Capri until his death in 1539.

References

External links and additional sources
 (for Chronology of Bishops) 
 (for Chronology of Bishops) 

16th-century Italian Roman Catholic bishops
1539 deaths
Bishops appointed by Pope Clement VII